Imam Arief Fadillah (born 14 December 1989) is an Indonesian professional footballer who plays as a goalkeeper for Liga 2 club Persela Lamongan.

Club career

Persitara Jakarta Utara
Fadillah joined Persitara Jakarta Utara, part of the 2011–12 Indonesian Premier Division in the 2011/2012 season.

PS Bangka
In 2013, he moved to Bangka Belitung, playing for PS Bangka. In a match against PSMS Medan, Fadillah snatched the ball from an opponent attacker. PS Bangka remained firm until the game ended.

Persika Karawang
He played for West Java club Persika Karawang. He was in the starting line-up in nine of ten games.

PS Barito Putera
In 2016, Fadillah joined the Banjarmasin club, PS Barito Putera, in the 2016 Indonesia Soccer Championship A.

Persib Bandung
In 2017, he returned to Persib Bandung for the Liga 1. He said, "Bandung is heaven for me. Back to Persib is certainly a dream come true. Initially, I didn't believe it. Because Arema F.C. Always call me. But eventually there was a call from Persib, yes this is my dream,"

PSM Makassar (loan)
In 2018, Imam Arief joined Liga 1 club PSM Makassar, on loan from Persib Bandung. He made his debut on 5 August 2018 in a match against Perseru Serui at the Andi Mattalatta Stadium, Makassar.

Persebaya Surabaya
He was signed for Persebaya Surabaya to play in Liga 1 in the 2019 season. Imam Arief made his league debut on 9 November 2019 in a match against TIRA-Persikabo at the Pakansari Stadium, Cibinong.

Sriwijaya FC
He was signed for Sriwijaya to play in Liga 2 in the 2020 season. This season was suspended on 27 March 2020 due to the COVID-19 pandemic. The season was abandoned and was declared void on 20 January 2021.

PSIM Yogyakarta
In 2021, Imam Arief signed a contract with Indonesian Liga 2 club PSIM Yogyakarta. He made his league debut on 12 October in a 0–0 draw against Persis Solo at the Manahan Stadium, Surakarta.

Persela Lamongan
Imam was signed for Persela Lamongan to play in Liga 2 in the 2022–23 season.

Honours

Club
PSM Makassar
 Liga 1 runner-up: 2018

Persebaya Surabaya
 Liga 1 runner-up: 2019
 Indonesia President's Cup runner-up: 2019

Individual
 Liga 2 Best XI: 2021

References

External links
 Imam Arief Fadillah at Soccerway
 Imam Arief Fadillah at Liga Indonesia

1989 births
Indonesian footballers
Living people
People from Tasikmalaya
Sportspeople from West Java
Persib Bandung players
Persitara Jakarta Utara players
PS Barito Putera players
PSM Makassar players
Persebaya Surabaya players
Indonesian Premier Division players
Liga 2 (Indonesia) players
Liga 1 (Indonesia) players
Association football goalkeepers